George Ford is an American illustrator. He was the first illustrator to win a Coretta Scott King Award in 1974 for his illustrations in Ray Charles by Sharon Bell Mathis. His wife Bernette Ford worked in publishing.

His illustrations for Ray Charles were made using acrylic paint.

Work
Ray Charles by Sharon Bell Mathis (1973)
The Story of Ruby Bridges
Wild Wild Hair
Baby Jesus Like My Brother
Willie's Wonderful Pet
Jamal's Busy Day
Bright Eyes Brown Skin
The Best Time of Day

References

American illustrators